Thrasimund I or Transamund I was the Count of Capua and then Duke of Spoleto (663 – 703 AD), a faithful follower of Grimoald I of Benevento.

Thrasimund assisted Grimoald in usurping the kingship of the Lombards. In return, Grimoald gave him his daughter in marriage and granted him the duchy of Spoleto after the death of Atto. Thrasimund co-ruled with his brother Wachilapus and was succeeded by his son Faroald II after a reign of forty years.

References

Sources
Paul the Deacon. Historia Langobardorum.
Hodgkin, Thomas. Italy and Her Invaders. Volume VI.

|-

Dukes of Spoleto
7th-century Lombard people
Counts of Italy
7th-century births
703 deaths

Year of birth unknown
7th-century rulers in Europe
8th-century rulers in Europe